Dumbell's Row is an intermediate stopping place on the Manx Electric Railway on the Isle of Man and is the first on the northern section of the line from Laxey, opened in 1899.

Location
The stop serves the village and is the nearest tram stop to the Laxey Wheel and lies to the north of the village's main station.

Siding
Nearby is located next to a siding which is now used to house the line's permanent way rolling stock but was used initially for the Year of Railways main event in 1993, when Isle of Man Railway locomotive No. 4 Loch of 1874 operated services between here and the Dhoon Quarry as part of a series of special events.

Reenactment
There was some historical precedent for this as during construction of the electric line, locomotives from the other railway were contracted for haulage purposes.

Facilities
The area was also the site of a temporary booking office (portakabin) especially for these services.  Today, the halt is served by a dual-purpose shelter which sits at the end of the terrace from which it gains its name (also known as "Ham & Egg Terrace").

Mines railway
Nearby is the Great Laxey Mines Railway, a reconstruction of an original 19" gauge line that served the mines, reconstructed in recent times be a group of enthusiasts.

Route

Also
Manx Electric Railway stations

References

Sources
 Manx Manx Electric Railway Stopping Places (2002) Manx Electric Railway Society
 Island Island Images: Manx Electric Railway Pages (2003) Jon Wornham
 Official Official Tourist Department Page (2009) Isle Of Man Heritage Railways

Railway stations in the Isle of Man
Manx Electric Railway
Railway stations opened in 1901